Penile torsion is a fairly common congenital condition with male infants. It occurs up to about 1 in 80 newborn males. With this condition, the penis appears rotated on its axis, almost always to the left (counterclockwise).

See also 
 Chordee

References 

 Bar-Yosef Y, Binyamini J, Matzkin H, Ben-Chaim J. Degloving and realignment—simple repair of isolated penile torsion. Urology 2007 Feb;69(2):369-71.
 Bauer R, Kogan BA. Modern technique for penile torsion repair. J Urol. 2009 Jul;182(1):286-90
 Snow BW. Penile torsion correction by diagonal corporal plication sutures. Int Braz J Urol. 2009 Jan-Feb;35(1):56-9
 Abdelhamid A, Zeid A, Soliman H. Penile torsion: An overlooked anomaly with distal hypospadias. Annals of Pediatric Surgery 2010 Apr; 6(2)93-97.
 Wilcox D, Godbole P, Cooper C.Pediatric Urology Book

External links 
 Penile torsion image

Congenital disorders of male genital organs